Sbardella is a surname. Notable people with the surname include:

 Antonio Sbardella (1925–2002), Italian football player
 Simone Sbardella (born 1993), Italian footballer 
 Vittorio Sbardella (1935–1994), Italian politician

Italian-language surnames